The following is an incomplete list of punk rock music festivals. This list may have some overlap with list of rock festivals and list of heavy metal festivals. Punk is a rock music genre that developed between 1974 and 1976 in the United States, United Kingdom, and Australia. Rooted in garage rock and other forms of what is now known as protopunk music, punk rock bands eschewed perceived excesses of mainstream 1970s rock. By 1976 the first festivals were being organized.

Festivals

Gallery

See also 

 Punk rock
 List of music festivals
 List of gothic festivals

Further reading 
 Christgau, Robert, "Please Kill Me: The Uncensored Oral History of Punk, by Legs McNeil and Gillian McCain" (review), New York Times Book Review, 1996.

References 

 
Punk
Heavy metal festivals